Qom is the sole constituency of Qom Province for the Islamic Consultative Assembly.

Elections

8th term

9th term

10th term

See also 
 Politics of Qom Province

References 

Electoral districts of Iran
Deputies of Qom